Adam Schroeder is an American film producer.

Selected works
He was a producer in all films unless otherwise noted.

Film

Television

External links

 Filmography on Film4 website

American film producers
Year of birth missing (living people)
Living people